Orla Brady (born 28 March 1961) is an Irish theatre, television, and film actress born in Dublin. She has been nominated for several awards from the Irish Film & Television Academy for her work in televised programs, as well as starring in the RTÉ/BBC co-production A Love Divided where she portrayed Sheila Cloney, for which she won the 1999 Golden Nymph Best Actress Award. She began her career with the Balloonatics Theatre Company as a touring performer, later gaining her first minor role in television as a bank clerk in the series Minder in 1993. Her first role in film was as Vanessa in Words Upon the Window Pane in 1994. Brady later appeared in recurring roles in a number of US and UK series and currently appears in two supporting character roles in the CBS-Paramount series, Picard. Brady appeared in the 2020 list of Ireland's greatest film actors, published by The Irish Times.

Early life and education
Brady was born on 28 March 1961 in Dublin, the daughter of Catherine  and Patrick Brady, the second of four children.  At one time, her parents were the owners of an establishment called Oak Bar, in Temple Bar, Dublin. She lived in Bray, County Wicklow, Ireland, from birth until the age of seven. She was educated at a Loreto Convent in Wicklow, and an Ursuline Convent in Dublin.

Brady began training in performance in 1986, with a year in Paris; she studied at L'École Philippe Gaulier, and secured a place at Marcel Marceau's École Internationale de Mimodrame de Paris. As she spoke of the time in interview, "there was a lot of clowning around, buffoonery and fencing. It was then that my own style kind of blossomed."

Career
Brady began her career touring with Balloonatics Theatre Company, in productions of Hamlet and Finnegans Wake. On returning to Dublin, she performed the role of Adela in House of Bernarda Alba at the Gate Theatre and Natasha in Three Sisters. After moving to London, she played Kate in Brian Friel's Philadelphia, Here I Come!, which later transferred from the King's Head Theatre to the West End.

Brady was cast in a minor TV role in 1993 and a first film part in 1994 (respectively, as a bank clerk in the series Minder and as Vanessa in  Words Upon the Window Pane); her first professional stage work was in the role of Ghislane in Stephen Poliakoff's Blinded by the Sun, performed at the Royal National Theatre in England in 1996, and she has since developed a career based on both Irish and British located theatre, television and film. These have included the RTÉ/BBC co-production of A Love Divided where she portrayed Sheila Cloney, for which she won the 1999 Golden Nymph Best Actress Award.

She also played one of four main characters in the BBC's drama series Mistresses, Siobhan Dillon, a lawyer who struggled to maintain her relationship with husband Hari while also having an affair. Also, she has appeared in RTÉ's Proof, and had roles in films such as Words Upon the Window Pane (1994), The Luzhin Defence (2000), How About You (2007), and 32A (2007).

Since moving to California in 2001, Brady has also appeared in Family Law, where she played Naoise O'Niell, a series that ran for 3 years on CBS. She also starred in Nip/Tuck, a US drama about plastic surgeons (in which she played Dr. Jordan), and starred in Shark as Claire Stark, the ex-wife of James Woods' character. In 2008, she appeared in Firewall, the second episode of the BBC series Wallander. She also appeared as Meredith Gates, a fleecing art collector who herself is conned in the first series of the British series Hustle.

Commencing in 2009, Brady portrayed Elizabeth Bishop, the wife of Walter Bishop and the mother of Peter Bishop in the Fox television series Fringe. In 2010, she appeared in the TV series The Deep alongside James Nesbitt, wherein she played Catherine, and starred in the TV series Strike Back as Katie Dartmouth.

In 2012, she appeared in the ITV series Eternal Law as Mrs Sheringham, an angel who fell in love with a human and became mortal, and played Taryn in the Sky One series Sinbad. In late 2013, she appeared as the Countess Vera Rossakoff in the television adaptation of The Labours of Hercules, part of the final series of Agatha Christie's Poirot alongside David Suchet. Brady appeared in a special production in the BBC science-fiction series Doctor Who, the 25 December 2013 Christmas special, The Time of the Doctor (as the character Tasha Lem). In 2014, she filmed Banished, playing Anne Meredith.

In addition to other indie roles, Brady appeared as architect Eileen Gray in Irish director Mary McGuckian's The Price Of Desire, which was in festivals in 2016 (and found a digital distributor in 2020). From 2017 to 2019, she had a main role in the AMC martial arts drama series Into the Badlands as Lydia. Brady had a recurring role in a season of the American Horror Story franchise, portraying Dr. Hopple in American Horror Story: 1984, the ninth season of the FX horror anthology television series.

As of 2022, Brady has had a recurring role in the science fiction television series, Star Trek: Picard—as Laris, wife of the now-deceased Zhaban (Jamie McShane), the two being former members of the Romulan Tal Shiar and now, workers in the wine production and home of Picard at his Chateau.

Other notable work
As described in 2013 by artist Jack Vettriano, Brady had modelled more than 25-years earlier for "a series of photographs of dancing couples", and those had "later inspired [his] most famous painting, ‘The Singing Butler’". While in her mid-20's, Brady had spent a day's work being photographed for an artist's guide, The Illustrator's Figure Reference Manual, and was paid about £50, and it was one of these images that led to reporting that Vettriano "owed his composition in part" to that Manual.

Awards and recognition

Brady has been nominated for several awards from the Irish Film & Television Academy for her work. She won the 1999 Golden Nymph award for Best Actress for her starring role as Sheila Cloney in the RTÉ/BBC co-production, A Love Divided at the Monte-Carlo Television Festival. In 2020, Brady was listed as number 43 on The Irish Times list of Ireland's 50 greatest film actors.

Personal life
In 2001, Brady moved to Los Angeles, where she met English photographer Nick Brandt, whom she married in December 2002 in the Chyulu Hills of Kenya. She also has a Georgian flat in Dublin. She admitted in an interview that she originally left Ireland as she found it a repressive place with little opportunity. The 2015 marriage equality and 2018 abortion referendums, as well as the expanding Irish industry, changed her mind, making her realise "Oh, this is a different Ireland and it accepts me now." Brady had a "Catholic upbringing," but as of 2002 considered herself an atheist.

Filmography

Film

Television

Further reading
  Note, this autobiographical work has apparently already been used as a source, without inline citation, in this article.

References

External links
 
 
 

1961 births
Living people
20th-century Irish actresses
21st-century Irish actresses
Irish atheists
Irish expatriates in the United States
Irish film actresses
Irish stage actresses
Irish television actresses
Actresses from County Wicklow
Actresses from Dublin (city)